"Walk On" is a song written by Steve Dean and Lonnie Williams, and recorded by American country music artist Reba McEntire.  It was released in March 1990 as the fourth and final single from her album Sweet Sixteen.  The song reached #2 on the Billboard Hot Country Singles & Tracks chart in June 1990.

Chart performance

Year-end charts

References

1990 singles
Reba McEntire songs
Song recordings produced by Jimmy Bowen
MCA Records singles
1989 songs
Songs written by Steve Dean